Palatka may refer to:

Palatka, Florida, a city in the United States
Palatka, Russia, several inhabited localities in Russia
Palatka (YTB-801), a United States Navy Natick-class large harbor tug
Palatka, a name used by the ethnic Hungarian minority for Pălatca, a commune in Cluj County, Romania

See also
East Palatka, Florida, a census-designated place in Florida, United States